Philemon Dickerson (January 11, 1788 – December 10, 1862) was a United States representative from New Jersey, the 12th governor of New Jersey and judge of the United States District Court for the District of New Jersey.

Education and career
Born on January 11, 1788, in Succasunna, Morris County, New Jersey, Dickerson pursued classical studies, received an Artium Baccalaureus degree in 1808 from the University of Pennsylvania and read law in 1813. He was admitted to the bar and entered private practice in Philadelphia, Pennsylvania from 1813 to 1816. He continued private practice in Paterson, New Jersey from 1816 to 1821, and from 1822 to 1833, having been admitted as a counselor in 1817. He was a member of the New Jersey General Assembly from Essex County, from 1821 to 1822.

Congressional and gubernatorial service
Dickerson was elected as a Jacksonian Democrat from New Jersey's at-large congressional district to the United States House of Representatives of the 23rd and 24th United States Congresses and served from March 4, 1833, until November 3, 1836, when he resigned, having been chosen as the 12th Governor of New Jersey by the New Jersey Legislature. He served as Governor and ex officio Chancellor from November 3, 1836, to October 27, 1837. He was appointed sergeant at law in 1834, being the last person in New Jersey to hold that title. He resumed private practice in Paterson from 1837 to 1839. He was elected as a Democrat to the 26th United States Congress, serving from March 4, 1839, to March 3, 1841. He was an unsuccessful candidate for reelection to the 27th United States Congress.

Federal judicial service
Dickerson was nominated by President Martin Van Buren on February 22, 1841, to a seat on the United States District Court for the District of New Jersey vacated by Judge Mahlon Dickerson. He was confirmed by the United States Senate on February 27, 1841, and received his commission on March 2, 1841. His service terminated on December 10, 1862, due to his death in Paterson. He was interred in Cedar Lawn Cemetery in Paterson.

Other service
Concurrent with his federal judicial service, Dickerson was President of the city council of Paterson in 1851.

Family
Dickerson was the brother of Mahlon Dickerson, a United States senator from New Jersey and Dickerson's predecessor on the United States District Court for the District of New Jersey.

Note

References

Sources

 
 New Jersey Governor Philemon Dickerson, National Governors Association
 Biography of Philemon Dickerson from The Political Graveyard
 

1788 births
1862 deaths
Democratic Party governors of New Jersey
University of Pennsylvania alumni
Democratic Party members of the New Jersey General Assembly
Judges of the United States District Court for the District of New Jersey
United States federal judges appointed by Martin Van Buren
19th-century American judges
American Episcopalians
New Jersey Democratic-Republicans
People from Roxbury, New Jersey
Jacksonian members of the United States House of Representatives from New Jersey
Democratic Party members of the United States House of Representatives from New Jersey
Burials at Cedar Lawn Cemetery
19th-century American politicians
United States federal judges admitted to the practice of law by reading law